Nguyễn Xuân Vinh (January 1, 1930 – July 23, 2022) was a Vietnamese-American aerospace scientist and educator. Vinh was Professor Emeritus of Aerospace Engineering at the University of Michigan, where he taught for nearly thirty years. His seminal work on the guidance, dynamics and optimal control of space vehicles and their interaction with the atmosphere played a fundamental role in space exploration and technological development.<ref>Optimal Trajectories in Atmospheric Flight 1981.

Education
Xuân Vinh attended the French Air Force Academy at Salon de Provence where he specialized in Aeronautical Engineering. In 1954, he graduated from the nearby Aix-Marseille University in Mathematics and was commissioned as an officer. The following year, he qualified as a French Air Force multi-engine pilot.

In 1965, Vinh was the recipient of the first PhD in Aerospace Engineering conferred by the University of Colorado at Boulder supervised by Adolf Busemann. In 1972, he was awarded a national doctorate in mathematics by the University of Paris, France.

Career and research
Following his return to Vietnam, Vinh was appointed Chief of Staff in the Republic of Vietnam Air Force in October 1957. In 1958, Vinh became the Commander and first Air Marshal of the Vietnam Air Force at the age of 28. He served as Air Force Commander until 1962 when he resigned and emigrated to the United States.

He joined the University of Michigan in 1968 as an associate professor of Aerospace Engineering and was promoted to the rank of professor in 1972. During his tenure at Michigan, Vinh chaired more than 20 doctoral committees. It is estimated that over 1,000 aerospace engineers studied under him.

Publications
As a scientist and educator, he has published three books and more than 100 papers in mathematics, astrodynamics and trajectory optimization.

In 1960, to promote a cadet recruitment program for the newly created Air Force Academy in Vietnam, he wrote a novel: Pilot’s Life'', which became a best-seller (now in its sixth printing) and he was awarded the Republic of Vietnam’s National Literature Prize. The novel is in the form of a series of letters written by a pilot to his sweetheart.

Awards and honors
In 1994, he was given the Mechanics and Control of Flight Award by the American Institute of Aeronautics and Astronautics. He was a member of the International Academy of Astronautics and a foreign member of the French National Academy of Air and Space.

In 2006, he won the Dirk Brouwer Award, awarded by the American Astronautical Society, for outstanding lifetime achievement in the field of space flight mechanics and astrodynamics.

Death
Vinh died at 2:39 p.m. Saturday, July 23, at his home in Costa Mesa, California, at the age of 92.

References

 

1930 births
2022 deaths
Vietnamese emigrants to the United States
Vietnamese people of the Vietnam War
South Vietnamese military personnel
South Vietnam Air Force generals and air marshals
Vietnamese writers
Writers of Vietnamese descent
University of Michigan faculty
Vietnamese anti-communists
People from Yên Bái province